Beatrice of Portugal (–) was Countess of Alburquerque as the wife of Sancho Alfonso of Alburquerque. She was the daughter of Peter I of Portugal and his wife Inês de Castro.

Life 
Beatrice was born in 1354 in Coimbra. Beatrice's entitlement to be considered an Infanta of Portugal is debatable. Some historians consider her a natural daughter of Peter I, so that title could never be attributed to her. Other opinions assert that the death of Inês de Castro was ordered by Peter's father Afonso IV of Portugal; after inheriting the throne, the Prince admitted that he had married Inês secretly, and she was thus a lawful Queen of Portugal.

Beatrice became Countess of Alburquerque when she married Sancho Alfonso of Alburquerque in 1373. Beatrice held this title for a year, until her husband died on 19 March 1374.

Children
Beatrice and Sancho Alfonso of Alburquerque had two children:

Fernando Sánchez of Alburquerque (–).
Eleanor of Alburquerque. (–). Married Ferdinand I of Aragon.

Ancestry

References

Bibliography
 

Portuguese infantas
1347 births
1381 deaths
House of Burgundy-Portugal
Castilian House of Burgundy
14th-century Portuguese women
14th-century Portuguese people
Daughters of kings